HMS Desperate was a two funnel, 30-knot destroyer ordered by the Royal Navy under the 1894 – 1895 Naval Estimates.  She was launched in 1896, served in Home waters and the Mediterranean before World War I.  She was based in Portsmouth during the war and was sold for breaking in 1920.

Construction
She was laid down as yard number 305 on 1 July 1895 at the John I. Thornycroft & Company shipyard at Chiswick on the River Thames. She was launched on 15 February 1896.  During her builder's trials her maximum average speed was 30.3 knots. She had her armament fitted in Portsmouth.  She was completed and accepted by the Royal Navy in February 1897.  During her acceptance trials and work ups her average sea speed was 25 knots.

She received a set of spare boilers produced by Messrs. Thorneycroft & Co. in late 1902.

Service
After commissioning she was assigned to the Chatham Division of the Harwich Flotilla. On 26 June 1897 she was present at the Royal Naval Review at Spithead in celebration of Queen Victoria's Diamond Jubilee. She was reassigned to Sheerness in January 1900 for instructional purposes at the Sheerness school of gunnery, including as tender to HMS Wildfire. Two months later, she was transferred to Chatham to relieve the destroyer  in the Medway Fleet Reserve.

She was involved in an accident at West Pier, Brighton in April 1900. The ship's boat carrying twelve seaman was swamped resulting in seven sailors drowning. Late in 1900 she was deployed to the British Mediterranean Fleet based at Malta. Lieutenant Edward Oliver Gladstone was appointed in command in September 1901. In September 1902 she visited the Aegean Sea with other ships of the station for combined manoeuvres near Nauplia.

She remained in the Mediterranean until November 1913, when she was ordered to return to home waters.  On her return to home waters she was assigned to the Portsmouth Local Defence Flotilla.

On 30 August 1912 the Admiralty directed that all destroyer classes were to be designated by letters. She was assigned to the D class along with other destroyers built to the same overall specification.  After 30 September 1913, she was known as a D-class destroyer and had the letter ‘D’ painted on the hull below the bridge area and on either the fore or aft funnel.

For the test mobilization in July 1914 she was assigned to the Portsmouth Local Flotilla.
In August 1914 she was in active commission tendered to HMS Excellent, the Portsmouth gunnery school.  She remained there for the duration of the First World War.

Fate
In 1919 Desperate was paid off then laid up in reserve awaiting disposal.  She was sold on 20 May 1920 to Thos. W. Ward of Sheffield for breaking at Milford Haven, Wales.

Pennant numbers

References

Bibliography
 
 
 
 
 
 
 
 

 

Ships built in Chiswick
1896 ships
D-class destroyers (1913)
World War I destroyers of the United Kingdom
Ships built by John I. Thornycroft & Company